Zhang Shi or Chang Shih may refer to:
Zhang Shi, mother of Mencius
Zhang Shi (prince) (died 320), ruler of the Former Liang state during the Sixteen Kingdoms period
Zhang Shi (scholar) (1133-1181), Song Dynasty scholar
Chang Shih (actor) (born 1966), Taiwanese actor